This is a list of notable individuals and organizations who have voiced their endorsement of the Libertarian Party's presidential nominee Gary Johnson for the 2016 presidential election. Note that "current" and "former" officeholders are identified by their status as of the time of their endorsement in 2016.

U.S. Representatives

Current
 Scott Rigell, Virginia (Republican)

Former
 Tom Campbell, California (1989–1993, 1995–2001) (Republican)
 Jim Kolbe, Arizona (1985-2007) (Republican)
 Tim Penny, Minnesota (1983-1995) (Independence Party)
 Dick Zimmer, New Jersey (1991–1997) (Republican)

State governors

Former
 Jesse Ventura, 38th Governor of Minnesota (1999–2003) (Reform Party and Independence Party)
 Bill Weld, 68th Governor of Massachusetts (1991–1997) and Libertarian Party's nominee for Vice President of the United States

State legislators

Current
 Tom Burditt, Republican Vermont state representative
 Laura Ebke, Libertarian Nebraska state senator
 Dawson Hodgson, Republican Rhode Island state senator
 Patti Komline, Republican Vermont state representative
 Mark B. Madsen, Libertarian Utah state senator
 John Moore, Libertarian Nevada assemblyman
 Joe Pickett, Democratic Texas state representative
 Heidi Scheuermann, Republican Vermont state representative
 Nicholas Schwaderer, Republican Montana state representative
 Lisa Torraco, Republican New Mexico state senator
 Daniel Zolnikov, Republican Montana state representative

Former
 Stan Adelstein, former Republican South Dakota state senator
 John Buckley, former Republican Virginia state delegate
 Basil Dannebohm, former Republican Kansas state representative
 Charlie Earl, former Republican Ohio state representative, 2014 Libertarian candidate for governor of Ohio
 John MacGovern, former Republican Massachusetts state representative
 Jim Nielson, former Republican Utah state representative
 Juan-Carlos Planas, former Republican member of the Florida House of Representatives
 Daniel Winslow, former Republican Massachusetts state representative
 Max Abramson, Libertarian New Hampshire state representative New Hampshire House of Representatives

Other state officials

Former
 Tom Daxon, former Oklahoma State Auditor and Inspector and Oklahoma Secretary of Finance and Revenue, former chairman of the Oklahoma Republican Party and nominee for governor of Oklahoma
 Andrew Napolitano, former New Jersey Superior Court judge, author, Senior Judicial Analyst for Fox News
 Andrew Sidamon-Eristoff, former New Jersey State Treasurer, New York Commissioner of Tax and Finance, and New York City Council member
 Darren White, former Secretary of the New Mexico Department of Public Safety

Municipal officials 
 Danny Jones, independent Mayor of Charleston, West Virginia
 Dave Richins, Republican Mesa, Arizona city councilman
 Tony Brooks, Republican Wilkes-Barre, Pennsylvania city councilman

International political figures

 Daniel Hannan, Conservative Party member of the European Parliament, Secretary-General of the Alliance of European Conservatives and Reformists
 David Leyonhjelm, Liberal Democratic Party Senator for New South Wales in Australia
 Karel Zvára, Free Citizens Party former deputy-leader from Czech Republic
 Radim Smetka, Free Citizens Party deputy-leader from Czech Republic
 Josef Káles, Free Citizens Party deputy-leader from Czech Republic
 Paul Nuttall, Leader of UKIP in the European Parliament

Other politicians
 Ed Crane, former National Chairman of the Libertarian Party, co-founder and former president of the Cato Institute
 Jo Jorgensen, academic; Libertarian nominee for President in 2020 and for Vice President in 1996; Libertarian nominee for U.S. Representative from SC-04 in 1992
 Jim Lark, chairman of Advocates for Self-Government and former National Chairman of the Libertarian Party
 Robert Morrow, Chairman of the Republican Party in Travis County, Texas
 Jennifer Nassour, former Chairwoman of the Massachusetts Republican Party
 Austin Petersen, 2016 Libertarian presidential candidate
 Mary Ruwart, 2008 Libertarian Party presidential candidate, author, biomedical researcher

Scholars
 Deirdre McCloskey, Distinguished Professor of Economics, History, English, and Communication at the University of Illinois at Chicago
 Jeffrey Miron, Senior Lecturer and Director of Undergraduate Studies of the Harvard University economics department, Director of Economic Policy Studies at the Cato Institute, former Department of Economics chair at Boston University
 Michael Munger, professor of political science and economics and former chair of Political Science department at Duke University

Businesspeople

 Jonathan S. Bush, Co-founder and CEO of athenahealth, member of the Bush family
 Marvin Bush, HCC Insurance Holdings and Securacom, member of the Bush family
 Patrick M. Byrne, founder and CEO of Overstock.com
 John Paul DeJoria, co-founder of John Paul Mitchell Systems and Patrón
 Jimmy E. Greene, president of the Greater Michigan chapter of Associated Builders and Contractors
 Phil Harvey, co-founder and president of Adam & Eve
 B. Wayne Hughes, chairman of Public Storage
 Steve Kerbel, businessman, entrepreneur and former 2016 Libertarian presidential candidate
 Palmer Luckey, founder of Oculus VR
 John Mackey, founder and CEO of Whole Foods Market
 Julian Robertson, founder of Tiger Management Corp.
 John Rowe, former CEO of Exelon
 Robert Sarvis, attorney, businessman, politician and software developer and former Virginia Senate and governor candidate.
 Peter Schiff, CEO and chief global strategist of Euro Pacific Capital, founder of SchiffGold, author, radio host, 2010 Republican U.S. Senate candidate for Connecticut
 Fraser P. Seitel, president and co-founder of Emerald Partners
 John Stagliano, founder and owner of Evil Angel
 Jeff Yass, managing director and co-founder of Susquehanna International Group

Media personalities

Actors and comedians

 Diedrich Bader, actor
 Drew Carey, comedian
 Brando Eaton, actor
 Penn Jillette, of Penn & Teller
 Melissa Joan Hart, actress
 Larry the Cable Guy, comedian
 Raven-Symoné, actress, singer, television personality
 Joe Rogan, comedian, actor
 Doug Stanhope, comedian, actor, 2008 presidential candidate 
 Teller, of Penn & Teller
 Brendon Walsh, comedian
 Randy Wayne, actor
 Kurt Yaeger, actor
 Elliott Morgan, YouTube personality and former SourceFed host

Directors and screenwriters
 Heywood Gould, director and screenwriter
 David Lynch, director and screenwriter

Athletes and sports figures

 Rudy Carpenter, football quarterback
 Hal Gill, retired professional ice hockey player
 Goldust, professional wrestler
 Kane, professional wrestler
 John Layfield, professional wrestler
 Chris Long, NFL football player
 Kevin Nash, professional wrestler
 Aron Price, professional golfer
 Kenny Smith, broadcaster and former NBA basketball player.
 Val Venis, professional wrestler
 Sean Waltman, professional wrestler

Commentators, writers, and columnists
 Peter Bagge, cartoonist and Reason contributor
 Ronald Bailey, science writer
 Joshua Brown, author of The Reformed Broker blog and commentator on CNBC
 Jay Cost, writer for The Weekly Standard
 Kmele Foster, co-host of The Independents, political pundit
 Nick Gillespie, editor of Reason.com and Reason.tv
 Jack Hunter, Politics editor for Rare.us
 Jeff Jacoby, columnist for The Boston Globe
 Arnold Kling, former writer for EconLog, economist
 William F. B. O'Reilly, opinion columnist for Newsday
 Debra Saunders, columnist for the San Francisco Chronicle
 Scott Stantis, editorial cartoonist for USA Today and the Chicago Tribune
 Jacob Sullum, syndicated columnist, senior editor of Reason
 Clay Travis, sports journalist, writer and television analyst for Fox Sports
 Jesse Walker, author and books editor of Reason
 Matt Welch, editor-in-chief of Reason magazine
 Cathy Young, writer for Reason, Newsday, and RealClearPolitics

Television and radio personalities
 Jillian Barberie, television and radio host
 Jedediah Bila, television and radio host
 Neal Boortz, talk radio host
 Steve Cochran, host of The Steve Cochran Show on WGN Radio
 Greg Gutfeld, television personality and Fox News host 
 Kennedy, television host, host of Kennedy on Fox Business
 Adam Kokesh, talk show host, activist
 Keith Larson, radio host and political commentator
 Katie Nolan, television host and sports commentator and comedian, Host of Garbage Time with Katie Nolan on FS1.
 Ronn Owens, talk radio host
 Dave Rubin, host of The Rubin Report
 John Stossel, media pundit
 Katherine Timpf, Fox News commentator
 Adrian Wyllie, activist, radio show host, 2014 Libertarian candidate for Governor of Florida and former chairman of Libertarian Party of Florida
 John Ziegler, radio show host and documentary filmmaker

Social and political activists

 David Boaz, executive vice president of the Cato Institute
 Scott Boman, Libertarian Party of Michigan activist and candidate 
 Alan Gura, litigator, constitutional lawyer
 Juan Hernandez, political advisor
 Carla Howell, president of the Center for Small Government
 Wendy Kaminer, former national board member of the American Civil Liberties Union
 Rob Kampia, co-founder and executive director of the Marijuana Policy Project
 Matt Kibbe, president of Free the People, former president of FreedomWorks
 John Kiriakou, CIA whistleblower and associate fellow for the Institute for Policy Studies
 Ed Lopez, Republican activist and Former National Vice Chairman of the Republican Liberty Caucus
 Brady C. Olson, founder of Deez Nuts presidential campaign
 Walter Olson, senior fellow at the Cato Institute and author
 Curtis Sliwa, founder and CEO of the Guardian Angels
 Richard Winger, publisher and editor of Ballot Access News, political activist and analyst

Major newspapers

 The Caledonian-Record
 Chicago Tribune
 Danville Register & Bee
 The Detroit News
 New Hampshire Union Leader
 The Post and Courier
 Richmond Times-Dispatch
 Winston-Salem Journal
 Yakima Valley Washington Daily Sun

Organizations
 Cornell College Republicans (temporarily renamed Cornell Conservatives)
 Independence Party of New York
 Marijuana Policy Project
 New Mexico College Republican Federation
 Swarthmore Conservative Society

See also
 List of Donald Trump presidential campaign endorsements, 2016
 List of Hillary Clinton presidential campaign political endorsements, 2016
 List of Hillary Clinton presidential campaign non-political endorsements, 2016
 List of Jill Stein presidential campaign endorsements, 2016
 List of Republicans opposing Donald Trump presidential campaign, 2016

References

Gary Johnson
Johnson, Gary
Johnson, Gary, 2016